Simon Jackson MBE (born 28 May 1972) is a visually impaired judoka and cyclist from Britain. He has competed in five Paralympic Games winning gold medals in three consecutive Games. Jackson is the only British person to win a Paralympic judo gold medal and the most successful judo competitor from the country. In addition to his Paralympic success he also won three world titles and 16 European gold medals. He switched to tandem cycling and won two events in 2009.

Sporting career
Jackson won gold medals at the 1988, 1992, and 1996 Summer Paralympics and bronze at the 2000 Games in his judo weight class. His loss to Cuban Isao Rafael Cruz Alonso ended a winning streak that had lasted 162 bouts. At the 2004 Games he lost in the first round against Sergiy Sydorenko, staging a sit-down protest against the referee's decision to award Sydorenko a match-winning yuko. Jackson claims that he was off the mat and that the points should not have been awarded. After the match the referee watched a video recording of the incident and confirmed the decision. Jackson remains Britain's most successful judo competitor.

In 2008 Jackson was forced to retire from judo competition after suffering a back injury. He began to focus on tandem cycling and partnered Barney Storey. He just missed out on selection for the 2008 Paralympic Games in Beijing but the pair went on to win gold at two events at the 2009 BT Paralympic World Cup.

Jackson was a member of the Channel 4 commentary team for the London 2012 Paralympic Games, covering judo alongside Neil Adams. Based on his experiences of disability sport he is also a motivational speaker.

Personal life
Jackson was born on 28 May 1972. He was appointed Member of the Order of the British Empire (MBE) for services to judo for disabled people in the 1997 New Year Honours.

References

External links
"Judo Jackson" – his homepage

1972 births
Living people
British male judoka
Paralympic judoka of Great Britain
Judoka at the 1988 Summer Paralympics
Judoka at the 1992 Summer Paralympics
Judoka at the 1996 Summer Paralympics
Judoka at the 2000 Summer Paralympics
Judoka at the 2004 Summer Paralympics
Paralympic gold medalists for Great Britain
Paralympic bronze medalists for Great Britain
Members of the Order of the British Empire
Medalists at the 1988 Summer Paralympics
Medalists at the 1992 Summer Paralympics
Medalists at the 1996 Summer Paralympics
Medalists at the 2000 Summer Paralympics
Paralympic medalists in judo